WaT (pronounced "Watto" ワット, for Wentz and Teppei) was a Japanese duo composed of singers/songwriters Eiji Wentz and Teppei Koike. They met each other in 2002 and formed WaT, playing live street performances with their guitars. Their debut single, "Boku no Kimochi", was released in 2005. Wentz, who is half German-American and half Japanese, is also a TV personality. Koike is also known as an actor and can play the harmonica. "Boku no Kimochi" reached the second place on the Oricon chart.

Members
 Eiji Wentz (from Tokyo)
 Teppei Koike (from Osaka)
Both of them play vocals and guitar. Wentz also plays the bass guitar and piano. Teppei also plays the harmonica and ukulele.

Discography

Singles
Their first independent single, "Sotsugyō Time", was released on February 18, 2004, under independent label and was later included on their first album.

Albums

DVDs

External links
 WAT  Fansite
 Wentz Fansite
 Teppei Fansite

Japanese pop music groups
Japanese musical duos
Musical groups established in 2002
Musical groups disestablished in 2016
Universal Music Japan artists
Musical groups from Tokyo
Japanese boy bands